Basketball Finland is the governing body of Basketball in Finland. It was founded and became members of FIBA in 1939.       

Basketball Finland operates the Finland men's national team and Finland women's national team. They organize national competitions in Finland, for both the men's and women's senior teams and also the youth national basketball teams.

The top professional league in Finland is Korisliiga.

See also
Finland men's national basketball team
Finland men's national under-20 basketball team
Finland men's national under-19 basketball team
Finland men's national under-17 basketball team
Finland women's national basketball team
Finland women's national under-18 basketball team
Finland women's national under-16 basketball team

References

External links

Finland at FIBA site

1939 establishments in Finland
Sports organizations established in 1939
Basketball
Basketball in Finland
Basketball governing bodies in Europe